Government Engineering College, Aurangabad is a government engineering college in Aurangabad, Bihar, India. It was established in 2019 under Department of Science and Technology, Bihar. It is affiliated with Aryabhatta Knowledge University and approved by All India Council for Technical Education.

Admission 
Admission in the college for four years Bachelor of Technology course is made through UGEAC conducted by Bihar Combined Entrance Competitive Examination Board. To apply for UGEAC, appearing in JEE Main of that admission year is required along with other eligibility criteria.

Departments 

The college have four branches in Bachelor of Technology course with annual intake of 60 students in each branch.

 Civil Engineering
 Mechanical Engineering
 Electrical Engineering
 Electronics & Communication Engineering
 Computer Science & Engineering

References

External links 

 Official website
 BCECE Board website
 Aryabhatta Knowledge University website
 DST, Bihar website

Engineering colleges in Bihar
Colleges affiliated to Aryabhatta Knowledge University
2019 establishments in Bihar
Educational institutions established in 2019